Crenicichla haroldoi is a species of cichlid native to South America. It is found swimming in the upper Paraná River basin, Brazil.

The fish is Named in honor of Brazilian ichthyologist Haroldo P. Travassos (1922-1977).

References

Kullander, S.O., 2003. Cichlidae (Cichlids). p. 605-654. In R.E. Reis, S.O. Kullander and C.J. Ferraris, Jr. (eds.) Checklist of the Freshwater Fishes of South and Central America. Porto Alegre: EDIPUCRS, Brasil. 

haroldoi
Freshwater fish of Brazil
Taxa named by José A. Luengo
Taxa named by Heraldo Antonio Britski 
Fish described in 1974